Carlos Lozano de la Torre (born February 9, 1950) is a Mexican politician and a member of the Institutional Revolutionary Party (PRI). He was elected Governor of Aguascalientes on July 4, 2010. Lozano was sworn into office on December 1, 2010.

References

1950 births
Governors of Aguascalientes
Senators of the LX and LXI Legislatures of Mexico
Institutional Revolutionary Party politicians
Living people
21st-century Mexican politicians